Panos Theodorou (born 3 September 1994) is a Cypriot footballer who plays as a midfielder.

References

External links

1994 births
Living people
Cypriot footballers
Cyprus under-21 international footballers
Apollon Limassol FC players
Aris Limassol FC players
AEL Limassol players
Karmiotissa FC players
Association football midfielders
Sportspeople from Limassol